Wangari is a name of Kikuyu origin that may refer to:

Wangari Maathai (1940–2011), Kenyan environmental and political activist
Catherine Wangari Wainaina (born 1985), Kenyan beauty pageant contestant
Margaret Wangari Muriuki (born 1986), Kenyan middle- and long-distance runner
Martha Wangari Karua (born 1957), Kenyan politician and former Minister of Justice
Meriem Wangari (born 1979), Kenyan half marathon runner

Kenyan names